Hajia Bola Muinat Shagaya  (10 October 1959) is a Nigerian businesswoman and fashion enthusiast. She is one of the richest women in Africa. She is the founder and CEO of Bolmus Group International, a conglomerate with holdings in real estate, oil and gas, banking and photography.

Biography
Hajia Bola Muinat Shagaya was born on 10 October 1959, she is the daughter of Adut Makur, a Sudanese seamstress, and Emenike Mobo, a Nigerian Public Servant. Bola Shagaya is known to have had her secondary school education at Queens School, Ilorin, and her tertiary education at Ahmadu Bello University, Zaria and Armstrong College in California, where she studied economics and accountancy.

She started her career with the audit department of the Central Bank of Nigeria before venturing into commercial activities in 1983. Her business experience started with the importation and distribution of photographic materials. She introduced the Konica brand of photographic materials into the Nigerian market and West Africa.

Hajia Bola Muinat Shagaya is also the managing director of Practoil Limited, one of the largest importers and distributors of base oil in Nigeria, serving local lubricant blending plants. Her business also includes investments in real estate, spanning across major cities in the country with over three hundred employees.

She is currently on the board of Unity Bank plc (formerly Intercity Bank) and has been for over eight years. She is also a member of the recently inaugurated Nepad Business Group – Nigeria. Hajia Bola Shagaya is a patron of the Fashion Designers Association of Nigeria (FADAN).

Money Laundering Investigation

Bola Muinat Shagaya is being investigated by Nigeria's Economic and Financial Crimes Commission, EFCC, for money laundering also involving Patience Jonathan, Nigeria's former firstlady.

Distinctions 

 July 2010: Member of the Order of the Niger (MON) awarded by the former President of the Federal Republic of Nigeria, Dr. Goodluck Ebele Jonathan (GCFR)

Private life 
She is currently married to Alhaji Shagaya, a Kwara State-based transport mogul, and has six children. Sherif Shagaya, Hakeem Shagaya, Deeja Shagaya, Naieema Shagaya, Amaya Roberts Shagaya and Adeena Roberts Shagaya. Her children are dispersed across the world, most reputably growing the Real Estate empire in both Europe and the United States. Also involved in minor business and industry holdings across Asia and Australia.

References

External links 
 The Official Website of Bola Shagaya 

1959 births
Living people
People from Ilorin
Ahmadu Bello University alumni
Members of the Order of the Federal Republic
20th-century Nigerian businesswomen
20th-century Nigerian businesspeople
21st-century Nigerian businesswomen
21st-century Nigerian businesspeople
Members of the Order of the Niger
Nigerian real estate businesspeople